John Huntley (born Herbert John Huntley, 4 November 1883 — 28 March 1944) was an Australian-born New Zealand cricketer who played for Otago. He was born in Brighton and died in Tuapeka.

Huntley made a single first-class appearance for the team, during the 1912–13 season, against Canterbury. From the lower order, he scored 8 runs in the first innings in which he batted, and 7 runs in the second.

Huntley took bowling figures of 0-27, as Otago lost the match by an innings margin.

See also
 List of Otago representative cricketers

External links
John Huntley at Cricket Archive

1883 births
1944 deaths
New Zealand cricketers
Otago cricketers
Australian emigrants to New Zealand